Veritiv Corporation is a business-to-business provider of packaging, publishing, and hygiene products. It has 125 operating distribution centers throughout the United States, Canada, and Mexico. It is headquartered in Sandy Springs, Georgia, part of the Atlanta metropolitan area.

The company is ranked 412th on the Fortune 500.

While Mary Laschinger was the CEO, it was the largest woman-run company in Georgia.

History
Veritiv was established on July 1, 2014 upon the merger of International Paper Company's xpedx division with the parent company of Unisource Worldwide, at which time International Paper Company completed corporate spin-off of the company.

In August 2014, the company leased its headquarters, in Sandy Springs, Georgia, from Cousins Properties.

In September 2017, the company acquired All American Containers, its first acquisition.

In 2020, during the COVID-19 pandemic, the company underwent a restructuring plan and cut its workforce by 15%.

In September 2020, CEO Mary Laschinger retired and was replaced by Salvatore A. Abbate.

See also
 List of Georgia companies

References

External links
 

American companies established in 2014

Companies based in Atlanta
Companies listed on the New York Stock Exchange
Former components of the Dow Jones Industrial Average
Manufacturing companies established in 2014
Multinational companies headquartered in the United States
Papermaking in the United States
Pulp and paper companies of the United States